Jüri Saar may refer to:
 Jüri Saar (Estonian politician, born 1946) (born 1946), Estonian politician
 Jüri Saar (Estonian politician, born 1956) (born 1956), Estonian politician and criminologist